Guido Pella and Diego Schwartzman were the defending champions, but Schwartzman decided not to participate this year. Pella played alongside Andrés Molteni, but they lost to Guido Andreozzi and Sergio Galdós in the semifinals.

Seeds

Draw

References
 Main Draw

Sao Paulo Challenger de Tenis - Doubles
Tennis tournaments in Brazil